Monett Township is one of twenty-five townships in Barry County, Missouri, United States. As of the 2000 census, its population was 5,906.

Monett Township was named for a railroad official.

Geography
It contains two cemeteries: Carlin and New Site.

The stream of Kelly Creek runs through this township.

References

 USGS Geographic Names Information System (GNIS)

External links
 US-Counties.com
 City-Data.com

Townships in Barry County, Missouri
Townships in Missouri